Harold Creeth Miller (born 23 February 1950) is a retired Irish Anglican bishop. He served as bishop of the Diocese of Down and Dromore in the Church of Ireland.  Coming from a Methodist background, he was elected bishop in 1997 and was considered to represent an evangelical position within the Church.

Ordained ministry
Miller was ordained in the Church of Ireland as a deacon in 1976 and as a priest in 1977. From 1976 to 1979, he served his curacy at Saint Nicholas' Church, Carrickfergus, Belfast, in the Diocese of Connor. He then moved to England, where he was director of extension studies and chaplain of St John's College, Nottingham between 1979 and 1984. He returned to Belfast, and was a chaplain at Queen's University Belfast from 1984 to 1989. In 1989, he returned to parish ministry having been appointed Rector of the Carrigrohane Union of Parishes in the Diocese of Cork, Cloyne and Ross. He was also a Canon of Saint Fin Barre's Cathedral (Cork Cathedral) from 1994 to 1997.

Miller was elected Bishop of Down and Dromore on 18 February 1997. He was consecrated a bishop on 25 April 1997.

On 20 June 2019 he announced his decision to retire.

He is regarded as theologically conservative and was one of the two bishops of the Church of Ireland, with Ferran Glenfield, to attend GAFCON III, held on 17–22 June 2018, in Jerusalem.

Involvements within the Church of Ireland 

 Member of General Synod, Standing Committee and the Representative Church Body
 Chair of the Liturgical Advisory Committee and Chair of the Publications Group, soon to publish a revision of the Book of Common Prayer 2004 
 Member of the Hymnal Revision Committee which produced the 2000 Hymnal
 Words editor of the new hymnal supplement
 Chair of The Covenant Council from its inception until 2008
 Member of the Commission on Episcopal Ministry and Structures
 Member of the Commission for Christian Unity and Dialogue and the Anglicanism Working Group
 Member of group which gave the response to the Oireichtas All–Party Committee on Abortion
 Member of group which produced the Church of Ireland Response to A Bill of Rights for Northern Ireland and also the group which produced the Church of Ireland response to Cohesion, Sharing and Integration

Involvements beyond the Church of Ireland 

 President of the Summer Madness Christian youth festival
 Board Member of Tearfund UK
 Diocesan Links with Albany Diocese in New York State, Maridi Diocese in Southern Sudan, and the Diocese of Northern Argentina, all of which he has visited
 Has attended the two Lambeth Conferences in 1998 and 2008
 Co–chaired AMICUM (The Anglican Methodist International Commission on Unity in Mission) from 2009 to 2015
 Has represented the Church of Ireland at eight of the meetings of The International Anglican Liturgical Commission.

Publications 

 Co–editor of Anglican Worship Today Collins, 1980
 Whose Office?– Daily Prayer for the People of God Grove, 1982
 Finding a Personal Rule of Life Grove, 1984
 New Ways in Worship CIEF, 1986
 Making an Occasion of it CIP, 1994
 The Desire of our Soul, Columba, 2004
 Build your Church, Lord, D&D, 2005
 The Making of the Church of Ireland Book of Common Prayer 2004: Yale Institute of Sacred Music: Colloquium: Music, worship, arts, 2006
 Week of All Weeks, 2015 (Worship Guide and accompanying Prayer Book)
 Editor: Thanks & Praise (Church of Ireland Hymnal Supplement) A&M, 2015

References

1950 births
Living people
20th-century Anglican bishops in Ireland
21st-century Anglican bishops in Ireland
Bishops of Down and Dromore
Irish Anglicans
Evangelical Anglican bishops
Anglican realignment people